After defeating the insurgency led by the Janatha Vimukthi Peramuna (JVP) in 1971, the Sri Lanka Armed Forces were confronted with a new conflict, this time with the Liberation Tigers of Tamil Eelam (LTTE) and other Tamil militant groups. The war escalated to the point where India was asked to intervene as a peacekeeping force. This was later seen as a tactical error, as the IPKF united nationalist elements such as the JVP to politically support the LTTE in their call to evict the IPKF. The war with the LTTE was halted following the signing of a ceasefire agreement in 2002 with the help of international mediation. However, renewed violence broke out in December 2005 and following the collapse of peace talks, the army has been involved in the heavy fighting that has resumed in the north and east of the country.

Since 1980 the army has undertaken many operations against the LTTE rebels. The major operations conducted by the army eventually lead to the capture of Jaffna and other rebel strongholds.

Major combat operations of the Sri Lankan Army

Eelam War I (1983–1987)

IPKF intervention

Eelam War II (1990–1995)

Eelam War III (1995–2002)

Eelam War IV (2006–2009)

Eastern Theater

Northern Theater

Major Battles

The table below lists all the major battles of the Sri Lankan Civil War. The information included in the table has been pieced together from the individual battle articles.

M
Sri Lankan Civil War
Military of Sri Lanka
Liberation Tigers of Tamil Eelam
Civil War
Indian Peace Keeping Force